Rod Bailey, stage name mcenroe, is a Canadian rapper and music industry entrepreneur. As an entrepreneur, he is the founder of his record label Peanuts & Corn Recordings, an independent hip hop distributor, as well as a company specializing in the marketing and promotion of independent music in Canada, Breadwinner Music Group.

Career
As mcenroe, Bailey was part of the hip hop band Farm Fresh.
He founded Peanuts & Corn in Brandon, Manitoba in 1994, and through it produced the band's first recording. He then moved his studio and label to Winnipeg, where he continued to write, perform and produce in the hip hop scene.

During the recording of Birdapres' album Nothing is Cool mcenroe took a musical as well as production part. The pair toured around Canada in support of the album. He also released several solo albums of his own raps, including Disenfranchised in 2006.

He later moved to Vancouver, where his label is a part of the Farm Fresh collective.

In 2013, mcenroe was interviewed about the hip hop music industry in Canada for the documentary film Hip Hop Eh.

Selected discography

Solo work
mcenroe - Billy's Vision 
mcenroe - disenfranchised
mcenroe - 5 Years in the Factory
mcenroe - The Convenience EP
mcenroe - The Ethics EP
mcenroe - Burnt Orange

With others
mcenroe and Birdapres - Nothing is Cool
Break Bread - Break Bread EP
Farm Fresh - Crazy Fiction
Farm Fresh - Played Out
Farm Fresh - The Space Ep
Farm Fresh Time is Running Out
Parklike Setting - School Day 2, Garbage Day 4
Parklike Setting / Fermented Reptile - Split 12"

Selected productions

References

Canadian hip hop record producers
Canadian male rappers
Living people
21st-century Canadian rappers
20th-century Canadian male musicians
21st-century Canadian male musicians
20th-century Canadian rappers
Year of birth missing (living people)